John H. Broeker House is a historic home located at Washington, Franklin County, Missouri. It was built about 1868, and is a -story, five bay, central passage plan brick dwelling on a brick foundation.  It has a side-gable roof and low segmental arched door and window openings.  The formerly separate brick washhouse or summer kitchen was connected to the house about 1940.

It was listed on the National Register of Historic Places in 2000.

References

Houses on the National Register of Historic Places in Missouri
Houses completed in 1868
Buildings and structures in Franklin County, Missouri
National Register of Historic Places in Franklin County, Missouri